Snakes for the Divine is the fifth studio album by American heavy metal band High on Fire.

History and recording
Snakes for the Divine was recorded at The Pass Studios in Los Angeles with producer Greg Fidelman. The album cover art and track listing were revealed on the band's Myspace page on January 6, 2010. The album was released on February 23 through E1 Music.

Theme
In an interview, frontman Matt Pike stated:
"The title 'Snakes for the Divine' is based on the premise that Adam and Eve weren't the first people on Earth, and Adam having a wife that was a Reptilian named Lilith. They were the first two people to take the reptilian DNA, and make shape-shifting human beings that go between the fourth-dimensional, the Anunnaki, and human beings. Eventually, from ancient Mesopotamia, this spawned a thing called the Illuminati - the enlightened ones - coming up through the centuries, and choosing the kings, controlling your media, controlling your banking, blah blah blah. It's just theory at most points. I thought it'd make a great metal song, so I just went ahead and started writing about that. That's how the record came about, as far as the theme.."

Reception

Exclaim! named Snakes for the Divine the ninth-best metal album of 2010.

Track listing

Personnel
Matt Pike – guitars, vocals
Jeff Matz – bass
Des Kensel – drums
Greg Fidelman – production
Arik Roper – album cover

References

2010 albums
High on Fire albums
Albums produced by Greg Fidelman